Stevenson Ranch is an unincorporated community in the Santa Clarita Valley of Los Angeles County, California. Stevenson Ranch is set in the foothills of the Santa Susana Mountains and lies west of Interstate 5 and the city of Santa Clarita. About  are set aside as parks, recreation areas, and open space. A master-planned community, it was approved by the county in 1987. The population was 20,178 at the time of the 2020 census. For statistical purposes, the Census Bureau has designated it a census-designated place (CDP).

It is home to Stevenson Ranch, Pico Canyon, and Oak Hills elementary schools (part of the Newhall School District), and Rancho Pico Junior High and West Ranch High School (part of the William S. Hart Union High School District). The Valencia Marketplace and Stevenson Ranch Shopping Center are popular shopping areas in the community. The area backs up to the historic oil-mining town of Mentryville, founded in 1875.

The names of many streets located in Stevenson Ranch are those of authors (e.g., Thackeray, Hemingway, Shakespeare, and Poe).

It is also the filming location of several film and television productions, including the television show Weeds, a Showtime original series, as well as the feature film Pleasantville. Its master-planned nature is at the heart of the suburban commentary of Weeds, such as the "Little Boxes" song and sprawling development portrayed in the opening of the show.

Geography

The Stevenson Ranch census-designated place includes two major subdivisions: Westridge and Stevenson Ranch proper.

Stevenson Ranch proper occupies the central and southern parts of the census-designated place. It includes the Valencia Marketplace and two elementary schools (Stevenson Ranch and Pico Canyon). Major thoroughfares in the community include Poe Parkway, Hemingway Avenue, Pico Canyon Road, and Stevenson Ranch Parkway. Pico Canyon Road and Stevenson Ranch Parkway continue east into the city of Santa Clarita as Lyons Avenue and McBean Parkway, respectively.

Westridge occupies the northern part of the CDP. It includes Oak Hills Elementary School, Rancho Pico Junior High, and West Ranch High School. The Oaks Club at Valencia, a country club and golf course, is located in Westridge. The major east-to-west thoroughfare is Valencia Boulevard. It is a wealthy community, with some of the Santa Clarita Valley's most expensive real estate. Although Westridge lies in the Stevenson Ranch CDP and zip code 91381, it was developed as part of Valencia.

The two subdivisions are connected by The Old Road. Both subdivisions are located west of Interstate 5. The Valencia neighborhood of the city of Santa Clarita lies to the east and northeast, Newhall lies to the southeast, and unincorporated Valencia lies to the north.

Government and infrastructure
The Los Angeles County Sheriff's Department (LASD) operates the Santa Clarita Valley Station in Santa Clarita, serving Stevenson Ranch for law enforcement. Traffic enforcement is handled by the California Highway Patrol (CHP). The city of Santa Clarita has tried unsuccessfully to annex Stevenson Ranch.

Demographics
The 2010 United States Census reported that Stevenson Ranch had a population of 17,557. The racial makeup of Stevenson Ranch was 11,271 (64.2%) White (53.9% Non-Hispanic White), 606 (3.5%) African American, 65 (0.4%) Native American, 4,028 (22.9%) Asian, 34 (0.2%) Pacific Islander, 765 (4.4%) from other races, and 788 (4.5%) from two or more races. Hispanic or Latino of any race were 2,827 persons (16.1%).

The Census reported that 17,557 people (100% of the population) lived in households, 0 (0%) lived in non-institutionalized group quarters, and 0 (0%) were institutionalized.

There were 5,663 households, out of which 3,006 (53.1%) had children under the age of 18 living in them, 3,761 (66.4%) were opposite-sex married couples living together, 533 (9.4%) had a female householder with no husband present, 231 (4.1%) had a male householder with no wife present.  There were 251 (4.4%) unmarried opposite-sex partnerships, and 42 (0.7%) same-sex married couples or partnerships. Of the households, 828 (14.6%) were made up of individuals, and 227 (4.0%) had someone living alone who was 65 years of age or older. The average household size was 3.10.  There were 4,525 families (79.9% of all households); the average family size was 3.48.

The population was spread out, with 5,659 people (32.2%) under the age of 18, 1,261 people (7.2%) aged 18 to 24, 4,871 people (27.7%) aged 25 to 44, 4,668 people (26.6%) aged 45 to 64, and 1,098 people (6.3%) who were 65 years of age or older.  The median age was 36.5 years. For every 100 females, there were 95.2 males.  For every 100 females age 18 and over, there were 91.0 males.

The homeowner vacancy rate was 1.3%; the rental vacancy rate was 5.1%. Of the population, 13,819 (78.7%) lived in owner-occupied housing units, and 3,738 people (21.3%) lived in rental housing units.

Climate

Notable people 

 Ryan Newman, actor
 El Hefe (Aaron Abeyta), guitarist
 Hunter Greene, professional baseball player

References

External links

1987 establishments in California
Census-designated places in Los Angeles County, California
Census-designated places in California
Planned communities in California
Populated places established in 1987